Sardar Beant Singh State University (SBSSU), formerly known as Beant College of Engineering and Technology, is a university located in Gurdaspur, Punjab, India. SBSSU imparts education in various Science and Engineering disciplines. SBSSU has seven academic and two administrative departments.

Location 
The University Campus is situated on (NH 54) Bariar, Gurdaspur and is 4.7 Km away from the New Gurdaspur Bus Stand (Under Construction),3.6 Km away from the Gurdaspur Railway Station and 5 Km away from the Old Gurdaspur Bus Stand. Renowned food brands viz. SUBWAY, BARISTA are popular food landmarks near University campus.

History 
Beant College of Engineering and Technology (State Government Engineering College), Gurdaspur, was established by the Government of Punjab as an autonomous institution through a registered society to provide technical education in the emerging areas of engineering and technology, and especially for the development of surrounding border areas. In line with the national policies of globalization and privatization, the college places special emphasis on the development of entrepreneurship and on industrial training. The foundation stone of the college was laid on  28 February 1994 by the late Beant Singh, then Chief Minister of Punjab. The first session commenced from 21 August 1995, when 120 students were admitted to three B. Tech disciplines. The college is approved by AICTE (All India Council Of Technical Education) and is given academic autonomous status by the University Grants Commission effective from the academic year 2014 onwards. In 2021 by an act of government it was upgraded to a university with the name of Sardar Beant Singh State University.

Courses Offered 
Under Graduation Courses:

1.Bsc.Agriculture
2.Bsc.Non-Medical
3.Bsc.Data Science
4.Bsc.Electronics
5.Bachelor of Computer Applications(BCA)
6.BBA-Marketing
7.Bachelor of Vocation-Industrial Automation
8.Bachelor of Vocation-Renewable Energy Tech
9.Bachelor of Vocation-Refrigeration and Air Conditioning 

Under Graduation courses (B.Tech):

1.Biotechnology
2.Chemical Engineering
3.Civil Engineering
4.Computer Science and Engineering
5.Mechanical Engineering
6.Electrical Engineering
7.Electronics and Communication Engineering
8.Electronics and Computer Engineering
9.Mechatronics and Automation Engineering

Post Graduation Courses:

1.Msc.Physics
2.Msc.Mathematics
3.Msc.Chemistry
4.Msc.Environmental Science
5.Master of Computer Applications(MCA)
6.PGDCA
7.MBA-Marketing 

Post Graduation Courses (M.Tech):

1.Computer Science and Engineering
2.Mechanical Engineering
3.Thermal Engineering

Integrated Courses:

1.Msc.Physics(Five Year Integrated Course)

TEQIP Phase-2 
The institution has been selected under the sub-component 1.1: strengthening institutions to improve learning outcomes and employability of graduates under the Technical Education Quality Improvement Program - II of National Project Implementation Unit, New Delhi. The financial assistance of worth Rs. 10.00 crore has been granted by the NPIU, New Delhi with a matching grant basis of 75:25 from World Bank and Government of Punjab. It is a academic autonomous, NBA and NAAC 'A' accredited college.

Academic Autonomy 
The Institution has been included under section 2(f) of the UGC Act, 1956 vide ref. no. F.8-518/2010 (CPP-I/C) dated 19.03.2012. The visit of the expert committee for the grant of Academic Autonomy has been completed on 23–24 April 2014 for onward implementation w.e.f. August 2014. The admissible grant under this scheme will be released to the college as per its eligibility, according to the norms laid down in the XII Plan guidelines for autonomous colleges by the joint secretary,(NCRB), University Grants Commission, New Delhi.

Student activities 
For the overall development of the students, various extra and co-curricular activities are present in the college. Various societies/clubs function under the faculty members. Some of the societies/clubs are as under:

Indian Society for Technical Education student chapter, SAE India (Society of Automotive Engineers),
IES (Innovative engineering society)
Entrepreneurship Development and Incubation center,
Chemical Engineering Society (CHES),
Biogen Society (Biotechnology),
IT Security and Computing (ITSC) society,
ESTER (Electronic Society for Technical Education & Research),
Punjabi Sabhyacharak club,
Literary society,
Photography club,
Environmental society,
Music and Dramatics club,
Fine arts club,
Phoenix club,
Apex management society,
NSS Wing,
NCC Wing.

Facilities

Hostels
Each hostel have adequate furniture and fixtures in every room. For further information, you can talk to Vixit Dehal (mech.- 4th yr.)

Computer center
One of the central facilities in the institute has 12 Mbits internet leased line connectivity, campus-wide networking connects all the office buildings and hostels via optical fiber cables between the central switch (located in the computer center) and various buildings (432 IO Points). All the office rooms have at least one LAN port. Internet Lab for the students in the Computer Centre having 40 personal computers. All the hostels have one computer room which has 24 LAN ports. Future plans are to install wireless networking on the campus (Wi-Fi Network) (under TEQIP-II), to upgrade Internet Leased Line Connectivity from 12 Mbits to 24 Mbits.

Central Workshop
In May–June months, workshop conducts a training program/industrial tours in reputed industries like R.C.F. Kapurthala, HMT Pinjore, PTL Mohali, Sugar Mills, Central Tool Room, Thermal Power Plants, etc. for the various technologies and subsequent operation of the plants.

Central Library
The Central Library was set up in 1995 in the Science Block of the college. It has a floor area of 2800sq. feet and the seating capacity of 110 readers. Library follows the open access system.

Dispensary
The College has dispensary to provide medical facilities under the guidance and observation of a qualified.
The dispensary provides medical aid to both students and staff.

Transport facility

Auditorium
Used in organizing cultural Programmes and technical events like conferences and seminars.

Bank
State Bank of India with ATM facility.

Gym

Shopping Complex

References

Engineering colleges in Punjab, India
Universities in Punjab, India
1995 establishments in Punjab, India
Educational institutions established in 1995
Gurdaspur